Grant is an unincorporated community in Inyo County, California. It lies at an elevation of 3730 feet (1137 m).
There are 2 alfalfa ranches and several families living in the area. On the road is a sign that says 'Grant'.

References

Unincorporated communities in California
Unincorporated communities in Inyo County, California